HMS Bulwark was a 74-gun third-rate ship of the line of the Royal Navy, launched on 23 April 1807 at Portsmouth. She was designed by Sir William Rule as one of the large class 74s, and was the only ship built to her draught. She was built at Portsmouth Dockyard by Nicholas Diddams.

As a large 74, she carried 24-pounder guns on her upper gun deck instead of the 18 pounders found on the middling and common class 74s.

History 

On 25 November 1813  was on her way from Hull to Martinique when Bulwark ran into her off the Owers. The collision dismasted Maister, which went into Cowes the next day.

On 22 May 1814, Bulwark recaptured Tiger, Cowan, master. The American privateer Yankee had captured Tiger as Tiger was sailing from Malaga to London. Tiger arrived at Halifax on 28 July. The records of the Vice admiralty court at Halifax show that Tyger, Henry Davidson, master, had been sailing from Malaga to Stettin, and that Bulwark had recaptured her on 24 July.

On 23 October 1814 Bulwark captured the American privateer schooner Harlequin, of 330 tons (bm), ten 12-pounder guns, and 115 men. She had been out only four days when captured.

On 22 January 1815, Bulwark captured the American privateer schooner Tomahawk, of Baltimore. She was of 210 tons (bm), had a crew of 84 men under the command of Philip Bessom, and was armed with eight 9-pounder carronades and a 24-pounder on a pivot carriage. She had been commissioned on 11 January, was two days out of Boston, and had not captured anything.

Fate 
Bulwark was broken up at Portsmouth on 26 September 1826.

Notes

Citations

References

 
 Hannings, Bud (2012) The War of 1812: A Complete Chronology with Biographies of 63 General Officers. (Jefferson, North Carolina: McFarland). 
 Lavery, Brian (2003) The Ship of the Line - Volume 1: The development of the battlefleet 1650-1850. Conway Maritime Press. .

External links 
 

Ships of the line of the Royal Navy
1807 ships
War of 1812 ships of the United Kingdom